This is a list of radio networks and stations in Sweden and elsewhere broadcasting exclusively or partly in the Swedish language.

Sveriges Radio

National networks
Sveriges Radio P1, talk and news
Sveriges Radio P2, classical music
Sveriges Radio P3, CHR music
Sveriges Radio P4, local news

Other channels

Private

Commercial radio

Networks
Rix FM (MTG)
Mix Megapol (SBS)
Lugna Favoriter (MTG)
NRJ (MTG)
The Voice (SBS)

Local distribution
Owned by MTG:
Bandit Rock 106-3 (Stockholm)
Bandit Rock 104-8 (Göteborg)
Star FM 101,9 (Stockholm)

Owned by SBS:
Rockklassiker (Stockholm)
Mix Megapol Borås (Borås)
Mix Megapol Göteborg (Göteborg)
Mix Megapol Malmö (Malmö)
Radio 107.5 (Stockholm)
Vinyl 107 (Stockholm)

Owned by others:
East FM (Norrköping)
Favorit 103.9 (Södertälje)
Radio Guld (Sundsvall)

Community radio
Non-commercial community radio license (närradio).

Stations broadcasting in Swedish outside Sweden

Public-service stations (Finland)
FSR Mixkanalen - see Yleisradio
FSR Plus - see Yleisradio
Radio Finland - see Yleisradio
Yle X3M - see Yleisradio
Yle Vega - see Yleisradio

Internet
Radioseven, dance music

External links 
Teracom - Terrestrial Broadcast Operator

Sweden
 
Radio stations in Sweden
Swedish